is a Japanese sword specified among the National Treasures of Japan. This sword is one of the Five Swords Under Heaven (天下五剣 Tenka Goken). This sword was a treasure of the Ashikaga shogunate. After the Ashikaga shogunate fell, the sword was in the custody of the Maeda clan.

See also
 List of National Treasures of Japan (crafts-swords)

Individual Japanese swords
National Treasures of Japan